Jabal Natfa',  is a mountain in Saudi Arabia located at 17°55′04″N 43°17′27″E in the As-Sarawat mountain range. At 2,965m above Sea level it is the third highest peak in Saudi Arabia. It is west of Al Harajah, Saudi Arabia.

References

Natfa